Sophie Wachner (November 5, 1879 – September 13, 1960) was an American costumer who designed costumes for Metro-Goldwyn-Mayer, Fox, and Selznick International Pictures in the early 20th century.  Her work appeared in films such as Just Imagine, A Connecticut Yankee, and Little Lord Fauntleroy.

Early life
Wachner was born in 1879 in Akron, Ohio, to Jewish immigrant parents from Hungary. She first began a career in teaching in Akron Public Schools, but in 1909 moved to New York City to design costumes on Broadway. She and her aunt, Frederica De Wolfe, spent ten years there, and during this time Wachner worked as a costumer for Florenz Ziegfeld Jr. In 1919, she moved to Los Angeles to work for Goldwyn Studios.

Career
Wachner joined Goldwyn Studios in August 1919, as they set up a new headquarters for their costume department. Wachner was well-known among the Los Angeles clothiers who supplied Goldwyn Studios' productions. While employed there, Wachner's opinion was greatly respected by the actors and directors she worked with, who "court[ed] her favor exactly as they court the favor of the public". William Wellman and G. B. Manly gave her the nickname 'Colonel Wachner'. Her early work for Goldwyn included costumes for the Hobart Henley film So This Is Marriage, which included a technicolor sequence depicting the story of Bathsheba and David, and He Who Gets Slapped, a 1924 psychological thriller starring Lon Chaney. For the 1930 film Just Imagine, she collaborated with Alice O'Neill and Dolly Tree to create a wardrobe for futuristic 1980s New Yorkers and Martians. Wachner left Goldwyn Studios for Fox in 1924, and worked there until 1930, when she was fired to cut costs. Wachner worked in Hollywood for over fifteen years, with her final film Little Lord Fauntleroy being released in 1936.

Filmography

References

External links
 

American costume designers
American people of Jewish descent
1879 births
1960 deaths